Paul Annacone was the defending champion but lost in the second round to Thomas Muster.

Anders Järryd won in the final 6–3, 6–3, 6–1 against Horst Skoff.

Seeds

  Thomas Muster (semifinals)
  John McEnroe (quarterfinals)
  Martín Jaite (quarterfinals)
  Horst Skoff (final)
  Carl-Uwe Steeb (second round)
  Alexander Volkov (semifinals)
  Jimmy Arias (second round)
  Michael Stich (first round)

Draw

Final

Section 1

Section 2

External links
 ATP singles draw

Singles